Seminole County is a county located in the central portion of the U.S. state of Florida. As of the 2020 census, the population was 470,856, making it the 13th-most populated county in Florida. Its county seat and largest city is Sanford. Seminole County is part of the Orlando-Kissimmee-Sanford, Florida Metropolitan Statistical Area.

History
On July 21, 1821, two counties formed Florida: Escambia to the west and St. Johns to the east. In 1824, the area to the south of St. Johns County was designated Mosquito County, with its seat at Enterprise. The county's name was changed to Orange County in 1845 when Florida became a state, and over the next 70 years several other counties were created. Seminole County was one of the last to split.

Seminole County was created on April 25, 1913, out of the northern portion of Orange County by the Florida Legislature. It was named for the Seminole people who historically lived throughout the area. The name "Seminole" is thought to be derived from the Spanish word cimarron, meaning "wild" or "runaway."

Geography
It is Florida's fourth-smallest county by land area and third-smallest by total area.

Seminole County's location between Volusia County and Orange County has made it one of Florida's fastest-growing counties. The Greater Orlando Metropolitan District which includes Seminole, Osceola, and the surrounding counties of Lake and Orange counties, together with neighboring Volusia and Brevard counties create a viable, progressive, and diverse setting for economic growth and residential development.

Adjacent counties
 Brevard County, Florida - east
 Volusia County, Florida - north and east
 Orange County, Florida - south and west
 Lake County, Florida - west

Demographics

As of the 2020 United States census, there were 470,856 people, 178,094 households, and 120,049 families residing in the county.

As of the census of 2000, there were 365,196 people, 139,572 households, and 97,281 families residing in the county. The U.S. Census Bureau estimates that the population of the county has grown to 394,878 by 2003. Current 2012 estimates put the population at more than 430,838. The racial makeup of the county was 82.4% White, 9.5% Black or African American, 0.3% Native American, 2.5% Asian, <0.1% Pacific Islander, 3.1% from other races, and 2.2% from two or more races. 11.2% of the population were Hispanic or Latino of any race.

There were 139,572 households, out of which 33.9% had children under the age of 18 living with them, 54.3% were married couples living together, 11.5% had a female householder with no husband present, and 30.3% were non-families. 22.9% of all households were made up of individuals, and 6.6% had someone living alone who was 65 years of age or older. The average household size was 2.59 and the average family size was 3.07. The Department of Education states that in 2003, school enrollment was approximately 72,630. As of 2006, the Seminole County School District was the 52nd largest in the nation. As of 2020, the Seminole County School District was the 12th largest school district in Florida and 60th nationally with more than 67,000 students and 10,000 employees.

Population was distributed with 25.4% under the age of 18, 8.4% from 18 to 24, 32.0% from 25 to 44, 23.6% from 45 to 64, and 10.6% who were 65 years of age or older. The median age was 36 years. For every 100 females, there were 95.90 males. For every 100 females age 18 and over, there were 92.90 males.

The median income for a household in the county was $49,326, and the median income for a family was $56,895. Males had a median income of $40,001 versus $28,217 for females. The per capita income for the county was $24,591. About 5.1% of families and 7.4% of the population were below the poverty line, including 8.6% of those under age 18 and 6.6% of those age 65 or over. As of March 2009, according to Workforce Central Florida, the unemployment rate for Seminole County is 9.2 percent.

Religion
The following reflects the latest year available for religious statistics, which was 2000.

Government and politics
Seminole County is part of the strongly Republican belt of central and southwest Florida that was the first portion of the state to move politically distance itself from the "Solid South": Until Joe Biden carried the county in 2020, the last Democratic Party candidate to win the county in a presidential election had been Harry Truman in 1948. , Republicans slightly outnumbered Democrats, 117,134 to 114,654, in registered voters.

The government operates under a County Charter adopted in 1989 and amended in November, 1994. Policymaking and the legislative authority are vested in the Board of County Commissioners, a five-member board elected to four-year terms in partisan, countywide elections and from single member districts. The board adopts the county budget, levies property taxes and other fees, and hires the county manager and county attorney. In addition to the board, five constitutional officers are elected to partisan, four-year terms in accordance with the constitution of the State of Florida.

The constitutional officers, clerk of the circuit and county courts, sheriff, tax collector, property appraiser, and supervisor of elections, maintain separate accounting records and budgets. The board funds a portion or, in certain instances, all of the operating budgets of the county's constitutional officers.

The county provides a full range of services:  the construction and maintenance of the county's infrastructure, public safety, recreation, health and human services, and development and protection of the physical and economic environment.

In addition to the county government described above, there are other political entities which are controlled by the county, but have their own appointed boards; the Seminole County Expressway Authority, the Seminole County Port Authority, the Fred R. Wilson Memorial Law Library and the US 17-92 Community Redevelopment Agency.

County elected officials
Republicans control all of Seminole County's partisan elected offices. In 2020, despite Joe Biden narrowly winning Seminole County in the presidential election, Republican candidates for county office won by wide margins over their Democratic opponents.

Secondary officials

Seminole Soil and Water Conservation District 
The Seminole Soil and Water Conservation District serves as an administrative role to conserve the environment within the county. Supervisor Amy Volpe resigned in April, 2021 and Sarah Hall was elected to replace her in a Meeting in June 2021.

The following officers are elected as indicated:

 Group 1 - Jason Kirby
 Group 2 - Jennifer Webb
 Group 3 - Sarah Hall
 Group 4 - Ed Young
 Group 5 - Karen Hariot

Law enforcement 

The Seminole County Sheriff's Office is the law enforcement agency for unincorporated areas of Seminole County.  the current sheriff is Dennis M. Lemma, who took office in 2017.

The Seminole County Sheriff's Office is currently accredited by eight independent bodies:
American Correctional Association (ACA)
American Society of Crime Lab Directors Lab Accreditation Board (ASCLD/LAB)
Commission for Florida Law Enforcement Accreditation (CFA)
Commission on Accreditation for Law Enforcement Agencies, Inc. (CALEA)
Florida Corrections Accreditation Commission (FCAC)
National Commission on Correctional Health Care (NCCHC)
National Emergency Management Accreditation Program (EMAP)
Public Safety Communications Accreditation

Libraries

The library system was founded in 1978 by the Seminole County Board of County Commissioners. It contains 500,000 volumes and has a circulation of 2.5 million books annually. There are five branches, located in the cities of Casselberry, Sanford, Lake Mary, Oviedo, and Longwood.

An online catalog is available including access to e-books and audio books. Library cards are restricted to county residents, property owners, students (enrolled in a county public school), or employed by the county government.

Education
Seminole County Public Schools operates public schools.

Transportation

Interstates and expressways
  Interstate 4
  Seminole Expressway (SR 417)
  Wekiva Parkway (SR 429)

Surface roads

 / US 17/US 92 (French Avenue/Orlando Drive)
  SR 46
  CR 46A
  SR 414
  SR 415
  SR 419
  SR 426
  CR 427
  SR 434
  SR 436

Airports
 Orlando Sanford International Airport

Public transportation
 Lynx
 SunRail

Communities

Cities

 Altamonte Springs
 Casselberry
 Lake Mary
 Longwood
 Oviedo
 Sanford
 Winter Springs

Census-designated places

 Black Hammock
 Chuluota
 Fern Park
 Forest City
 Geneva
 Goldenrod (with Orange County)
 Heathrow
 Midway
 Wekiwa Springs

Unincorporated communities

 Bertha
 Indian Mound Village
 Lake Monroe
 Slavia
 Sanlando Springs
 Taintsville
 Tuskawilla

Former communities
 Markham
 Osceola

See also

 Little Big Econ State Forest
 National Register of Historic Places listings in Seminole County, Florida

Notes

References

External links

 
 Seminole County Government / Board of County Commissioners
 Seminole County Government / Mosquito Control Program
 Photographs from the State Library & Archives of Florida.
 Seminole County Jail Information

 
Charter counties in Florida
Florida placenames of Native American origin
1913 establishments in Florida
Populated places established in 1913
Counties in Greater Orlando